Oz the Great and Powerful (Original Motion Picture Soundtrack) is the soundtrack album to the 2013 film of the same name, produced by Walt Disney Pictures. The film is directed by Sam Raimi, and featured musical score composed by Danny Elfman. The score was recorded at Sony Scoring Stage and the album featured 27 tracks with a promotional single titled "Almost Home" performed by American singer-songwriter Mariah Carey. The soundtrack was released by Walt Disney Records on March 5, 2013, followed by a physical CD release in association with Intrada Records on March 26.

Development 
In June 2011, composer Danny Elfman was chosen to score for Oz the Great and Powerful, in his fifth collaboration with Raimi on Darkman (1990), A Simple Plan (1998), Spider-Man (2002) and Spider-Man 2 (2004). It also marked Elfman's re-union with Raimi, as due to their creative differences on scoring Spider-Man 2 Elfman decided not to collaborate with Raimi on his forthcoming projects, this meant that Elfman did not compose for the third instalment Spider-Man 3. He noted that the film's score was accessibly quick to produce, with a majority of the music being written in six weeks. Regarding the tonal quality of the score, Elfman stated, "We're going to take an approach that's old school but not self-consciously old-fashioned. Let the melodrama be melodrama, let everything be what it is. I also think there's the advantage that I'm able to write narratively, and when I'm able to write narratively I can also move quicker because that's my natural instincts, I can tell a story in the music." Elfman did not adapt any of the musical influences from The Wizard of Oz (1939), despite having pop-culture references "visually and musically". Raimi insisted Elfman, that the team were working on L. Frank Baum's early 20th century Oz novels and not from the film. He decided to create a "fresh music for the setting", but also wanted to pay homage to the 1939 film.

American singer-songwriter Mariah Carey recorded a promotional single called "Almost Home" written by Carey, Simone Porter, Justin Gray, Lindsey Ray, Tor Erik Hermansen, and Mikkel Eriksen (a.k.a. Stargate) for the soundtrack of the film. The song was recorded at February 6, 2013 at New York City at Roc The Mic Studios. In a statement, Carey said that the song has "a message that works beautifully with the film. It's a feel-good record; it gives you the feeling of reaching your home and being with people that you love." The single was released on February 19, 2013 by Island Records, despite being leaked a day before.

Track listing

Reception 
Gregory Heaney of AllMusic wrote "the score of Oz the Great and Powerful feels like an avenue of escape for dreamers looking for something to break up the monotony of their humdrum days, and while it might lack the catchy musical numbers of its predecessor, it's nevertheless a solid outing from Elfman." Filmtracks.com wrote "Oz the Great and Powerful is one of those great ambient listening experiences in the genre that doesn't stand up to focused analysis upon a closer look. For many listeners, such details won't matter, but that is what distinguishes a solid, workmanlike score from one destined to be a classic." A review from Beyond the Marquee stated "Of particularly high merit are the delicate emotional chords of Oscar’s character arc from con man to wizard hero.  Luckily the emotional range missing from Franco’s performance is conveyed in the nuance of Elfman’s leitmotif.  This would be even better had Franco’s acting skills matched the melodies in quality but, to quote comedian Steven Wright, 'you can’t have everything… where would you put it?'" ClassicFM wrote "Danny Elfman's soundtrack gets off to a fantastically glitzy start, with orchestral and choral bombast to spare - perfect vintage Hollywood fare. Another corking soundtrack from one of the modern masters of the genre."

Personnel 
Credits adapted from CD liner notes

 Musicians
 Bass – Bruce Morgenthaler, Chris Kollgaard, Drew Dembowski, Ed Meares, Ian Walker, Mike Valerio, Oscar Hidalgo, Steve Dress
 Bass Trombone – Phil Teele
 Bassoon – John Steinmetz, Rose Corrigan
 Cello – Andrew Shulman, Tony Cooke, Armen Ksajikian, Cecilia Tsan, Chris Ermacoff, Dennis Karmazyn, Giovanna Clayton, Paul Cohen, Steve Erdody, Tim Landauer, Tim Loo, Trevor Handy
 Clarinet – Gary Bovyer, Ralph Williams, Stuart Clark
 Flute – Heather Clark, Louise Ditullio
 French horn – Dan Kelley, Dave Everson, Dylan Hart, Jennie Kim, Kristy Morrell, Laura Brenes, Mark Adams, Nathan Campbell, Phil Yao, Steve Becknell
 Guitar – George Doering
 Oboe – Leslie Reed, Phil Ayling
 Percussion – Dan Greco, Don Williams, Wade Culbreath, Bob Zimmitti, Mike Fisher
 Piano – TJ Lindgren
 Soloist – Mike Fisher
 Timpani – Peter Limonick
 Trombone – Alan Kaplan, Alex Iles, Andy Martin, Bill Reichenbach, Charlie Loper, Steve Holtman, Bill Booth
 Trumpet – Barry Perkins, Dan Fornero, Jon Lewis, Marissa Benedict
 Tuba – Doug Tornquist, Jim Self
 Viola – Alma Fernandez, Brian Dembow, Carolyn Riley, Darrin McCann, David Walther, Keith Greene, Luke Maurer, Matt Funes, Robert Brophy, Shawn Mann, Thomas Diener, Vickie Miskolczy
 Violin – Alyssa Park, Ana Landauer, Carol Pool, Darius Campo, Eun-Mee Ahn, Grace Oh, Jackie Brand, Jennie Levin, Joel Derouin, Josefina Vergara, Julie Gigante, Julie Rogers, Katia Popov, Lily Ho Chen, Marc Sazer, Natalie Leggett, Neel Hammond, Nina Evtuhov, Phil Levy, Richard Altenbach, Roberto Cani, Sarah Thornblade, Shalini Vijayan, Sid Page, Tereza Stanislav, Roger Wilkie
 Concertmaster – Bruce Dukov

 Orchestra and choir
 Orchestra – The Hollywood Studio Symphony
 Orchestrated by – Dave Slonaker, Edgardo Simone
 Orchestra supervisor – Steve Bartek
 Orchestra conductor – Pete Anthony
 Orchestra contractor – Gina Zimmitti
 Digital Orchestral Timings – Richard Grant
 Choir conductor – Marc Mann
 Choir contractor – Bobbi Page

 Production
 Music composer and producer – Danny Elfman
 Additional music production – Monica Zierhut
 Musical assistance – Melisa McGregor, Melissa Karaban
 Technician– Greg Maloney
 Music supervisor – Marc Mann
 Music editor – Shie Rozow
 Assistant music editor – Denise Okimoto
 Supervising music editor – Bill Abbott
 Temp assistant music editor – Katia Lewin
 Temp music editor – Ellen Segal
 Additional arrangements – TJ Lindgren
 Recorded by – Dennis Sands
 Recorded at – Sony Scoring Stage, Studio Della Morte
 Additional recording – Noah Snyder
 Recordist – Adam Michalak, Adam Olmstead, Noah Snyder
 Mixed by – Alan Meyerson, Dennis Sands
 Mixed at – Todd-AO, Remote Control Productions
 Assistant mixing – Christian Wenger, Greg Hayes
 Copyist (music preparation) – Reprise Music Services, Rob Skinnell
 Executive producer (music) – Sam Raimi
 Artwork design – Steve Gerdes
 Management (executive in-charge) – Mitchell Leib
 Management (music business affairs/legal advisor) – Scott Holtzman, Sylvia Krask

Awards

References 

2010s film soundtrack albums
2013 soundtrack albums
Danny Elfman soundtracks
Disney film soundtracks
Walt Disney Records soundtracks
Oz (franchise)